MFK Havířov is a Czech football club located in Havířov. It currently plays in Divize E, which is in the Czech Fourth Division.

In the 1993–94, 1994–95, 1995–96 and 1996–97 seasons, the club played in the Czech 2. Liga.

Historical names
 1922 ČSK Moravská Suchá
 AFK Suchá
 SK Beskyd Havířov
 Baník Dukla Havířov
 Baník Dukla Suchá
 TJ Dolu Dukla Suchá
 TJ Baník Havířov
 FK Baník Havířov
 2003 FK Havířov
 2006 MFK Havířov

Managers
Bohuš Keler is the current club manager, having taken over in January 2011.

References

External links
  

Football clubs in the Czech Republic
Association football clubs established in 1992
Havířov